Seishirō, Seishiro or Seishirou (written: , , , ,  or ) is a masculine Japanese given name. Notable people with the name include:

, Japanese aikidoka
, Japanese politician
, Japanese general
, Japanese child actor
, Japanese actor
, Japanese American jujutsuka
, Japanese baseball player
, Japanese footballer

Fictional characters
, a character in the manga series Blue Lock
, a character in the manga series Tokyo Babylon
, a character in the manga series Tsubasa ~RESERVoir CHRoNiCLE~

Japanese masculine given names